Ernest Howard Crosby (November 4, 1856 – January 3, 1907) was an American reformer, georgist, and author.

Early life
Crosby was born in New York City in 1856. He was the son of the Rev. Dr. Howard Crosby (1826-1891), a Presbyterian minister, and Margaret Evertson Givan, a descendant of the prominent Dutch Evertson family. Crosby was a relative of prolific hymn-writer and rescue mission worker Fanny Crosby.

He was educated at New York University and the Columbia Law School. He was a member of the Delta Phi fraternity during his time at New York University.

Career
While a member of the State Assembly (1887–1889), he introduced three high-license bills, all vetoed by the Governor David Bennett Hill. From 1889 to 1894, he was judge of the Court of the First Instance at Alexandria, Egypt.

He became an exponent of the theories of Count Tolstoy, whom he visited before his return to America; his relations with the great Russian later ripened into intimate friendship, and he devoted himself in America largely to promulgating Tolstoy's ideas of universal peace. His book, Plain Talk in Psalm and Parable (1899), was widely commended by such writers as Björnson, Kropotkin, and Zangwill.

Crosby was a vegetarian and supporter of animal rights, authoring an essay entitled "The Meat Fetish", published in the Humanitarian League's quarterly publication, the Humane Review in 1904; this was later published as a pamphlet. He was also president of the New York Vegetarian Society.

Like the Englishman Edward Carpenter, the subject of his book Poet and Prophet, Crosby's poetry (in the volume Swords and Plowshares) followed the example of Whitman's free verse.

Death and burial
Crosby died of pneumonia in Baltimore, Maryland on January 3, 1907. His remains were transported to New York and he was buried in Rhinebeck, New York, where he maintained an estate.

Personal life
In 1881, Crosby married Frances (Fanny) Kendall Schieffelin, daughter of Henry Maunsell Schieffelin. Their children were Margaret Eleanor and Maunsell Schieffelin Crosby.

Published works
 Captain Jinks, Hero, illustrated by Daniel Carter Beard, (1902)
 Swords and Plowshares (1902)
 Tolstoy and His Message (1903; second edition, 1904)
 Tolstoy as a Schoolmaster (1904)
 Carpenter: Poet and Prophet (second edition, 1905)
 Garrison, the Non-Resistant and abolitionist (Chicago, 1905)
 Broad-Cast (1905)
 The Meat Fetish: Two Essays on Vegetarianism, (by Ernest Howard Crosby and Elisée Reclus, 1905)
 Labor and Neighbor (1908)

Footnotes

Additional source

Further reading 

 
 Frederick, Peter J. (1976). Knights of the Golden Rule: The Intellectual As Christian Social Reformer in the 1890s. Lexington, KY: University Press Of Kentucky.
Gianakos, Perry E. 1972. “Ernest Howard Crosby: A Forgotten Tolstoyan Anti-Militarist and Anti-Imperialist.” American Studies  13 (1): 11–29.
Whittaker, R. 1997. "Tolstoy's American Disciple: Letters to Earnest Howard Crosby, 1894-1906". TRIQUARTERLY. (98): 210-250.

External links

 
 
 
 
 The Soldier’s Creed, a poem by Ernest Crosby, collected in Liberty and the Great Libertarians (1913) ed. by Charles T. Sprading, p. 54.

1856 births
1907 deaths
19th-century American essayists 
19th-century American male writers
19th-century American poets
19th-century American politicians
19th-century jurists
20th-century American essayists
20th-century American male writers
20th-century American poets
20th-century American politicians
20th-century jurists
American animal rights activists
American expatriates in Egypt
American humanitarians
American male essayists
American jurists
American male poets
American people of Dutch descent
American political writers
American vegetarianism activists
Burials in New York (state)
Calvinist pacifists
Columbia Law School alumni
Deaths from pneumonia in Maryland
Georgists
Members of the New York State Assembly
New York University alumni
People from Alexandria
People from Rhinebeck, New York
Poets from New York (state)
Politicians from New York City
Tolstoyans
Writers from New York City